Ludwig van Beethoven (1770–1827) was a German composer and pianist.

Beethoven may also refer to:

Arts and entertainment
Beethoven (film), a 1992 family film
Beethoven (franchise), a series of eight films
Beethoven (TV series), an animated show loosely based on the film
Beethoven (band), a late 1980s band formed by former members of the Irish band Five Go Down to the Sea?
"Beethoven (I Love to Listen To)", a 1987 song by Eurythmics
"Beethoven" (song), by Union J

Outer space
Beethoven quadrangle, an area of the planet Mercury
Beethoven (crater), a crater within the quadrangle
1815 Beethoven, an asteroid

People
Johann van Beethoven (1740–1792), father of Ludwig
Johanna van Beethoven (1786–1869), sister-in-law of Ludwig
Kaspar Anton Karl van Beethoven (1774–1815), brother of Ludwig
Ludwig van Beethoven (1712–1773), grandfather of Ludwig
Beethoven Javier (1947-2017), Uruguayan football player
Michael V. (Beethoven del Valle Bunagan, born 1969), Filipino television personality

Other uses
Beethoven (horse) (born 2007), a Thoroughbred racehorse

See also
Bettenhoven, the ancestral village of the musical family

Dutch-language surnames